Barefoot Boy with Cheek is a 1947 comedic Broadway musical written by Max Shulman, with music by Sidney Lippman and lyrics by Sylvia Dee. The show, which satirizes college life at the "fictitious" University of Minnesota, is based on Shulman's 1943 novel of the same name. It premiered at the Martin Beck Theatre on April 3, 1947, and closed on July 5 of that year after 108 performances.

Productions 
Prior to its staging on Broadway, the show saw out-of-town tryouts in March in New Haven and Boston. The show's original act one finale, "Don't Spoil the Party", was cut before its Broadway premiere.

For the Broadway production, George Abbott directed and produced, Milton Rosenstock was the music director, Richard Barstow provided choreography, and Jo Mielziner provided set and lighting design.

In 2011 a reading of the show was done at Manhattan Theatre Club's Creative Center as part of UnsungMusicalsCo. Inc's Archival Project. Jenn Colella, Randy Donaldson, Jenny Fellner, Nick Gaswirth, Drew Gehling, Anne Horak, Robert Lenzi, Sarah Litzsinger, Nora Mae Lyng, Rye Mullis, Greg Reuter, and Max von Essen participated in the reading. The libretto remained almost entirely original, and included "Don't Spoil the Party" in its original placement at the end of act one.

Cast

Songs

Act l 

 A Toast to Alpha Cholera
 We Feel Our Man Is Definitely You
 The Legendary Eino Fflliikkiinnenn
 Too Nice a Day to Go to School
 I Knew I'd Know
 I'll Turn a Little Cog
 Who Do You Think You Are?
 Everything Leads Right Back to Love
 Little Yetta's Gonna Get a Man
 Alice in Boogieland

Act ll 

 After Graduation Day
 There's Lots of Things You Can Do With Two (But Not With Three)
 The Story of Carrot
 When You Are Eighteen
 Star of the North Star State
 Reprise: I Knew I'd Know
 It Couldn't Be Done (But We Did It)

Reception 
The show received positive reviews before its transfer to Broadway, but New York theater critics were less enamored with the show. Audiences, however, seemed to enjoy the production. The show's first full week of performances resulted in a $34,232 box office gross, the highest in the theater's history.

External links 

 Internet Broadway Database page

References 

 1947 musicals
Broadway musicals
Musicals based on novels
Plays set in Minnesota
University of Minnesota